Koodalloor is a village in Kottayam district, Kerala, India. It is strategically located 7 Kilometers off from Ettumanoor - Pala Road (deviated at Koodalloor Kavala Jn), 2 km from Kadaplamttom 24 km from Kottayam town. It has paddy fields, natural rubber plantations and other agricultural products. Kodalloor is blessed with a popular market, St Joseph's Church, St. Joseph's LP school under Pala diocese, St. Mary's Church and St. Joseph UP  School under Kottayam diocese.

This village belongs to Kaduthuruthy legislative constituency and nearby villages are Kadaplamattom, Kidangoor, Vayala, Kadapoor.

References

Villages in Kottayam district